Detuning can refer to:
Musical tuning, the act of tuning an instrument or voice
Engine tuning, detuning one aspect, such as power, in favor of another aspect such as economy
Laser detuning, the difference between a laser frequency and a resonant frequency